Mame Khan is an Indian playback and folk singer from Rajasthan, India. He has been playback singer for numerous Hindi films such as Luck By Chance (2009), I Am (2010), No One Killed Jessica (2011), Mirzya (2016) and Sonchiriya (2019). Khan was featured on Coke Studio @ MTV (second season) along with Amit Trivedi, the duo performed the track Chaudhary. He received the Best Folk Single Award at Global Indian Music Academy Awards (GiMA) 2016.

Early life and background 
Mame Khan was born in Satto, a small village near Jaisalmer in Rajasthan. He belongs to the Manganiyar community of Rajasthan, India. He was exposed to folk music of the Manganiyar community since childhood. His father, Ustad Rana Khan was also a Rajasthani folk singer. At the age of 14, he was given a six-year scholarship by the Indian Council for Cultural Relations to pursue his studies in music and arts.

Career 

Khan made his singing debut in Bollywood with Shankar Mahadevan for the film Luck By Chance in 2009. However, he shot into the spotlight, when he appeared in an episode of Coke Studio @ MTV (season 2), featuring the song Chaudhary in collaboration with music director Amit Trivedi in 2012. Mame also performed another title Badri badariya at Coke Studio @ MTV, where he collaborated with singer Mili Nair.
He sang for movies like Mirzya, I Am, No One Killed Jessica and Sonchiriya. He also lent his voice for a Hindi song in Malayalam film, Monsoon Mangoes.

In October 2015, Khan released his debut album, Mame Khan's Desert Sessions, which was crowd funded. He sang the national anthem for Hotstar and Star Sports's 2015 Pro Kabaddi League season. In December 2016, he released a single, Sanu Ik Pal Chain Na Ave, which was a combination of Punjabi and Rajasthani folk music. In December 2017, he had collaboration with composer duo Salim–Sulaiman for McDowell's No.1's No.1 Yaari Jam's Yaari song. He also sang for television commercials for clients such as Samsung and Tanishq.

He was also a part of Shankar Mahadevan's folk project titled My Country, My Music. He was the lead vocalist of Roysten Abel's show, The Manganiyar Seduction, which has been touring the world since 2006. He has performed at some of India's most popular festivals including the NH7 Weekender, Mood Indigo, Repertwahr Festival, Rajasthan Partnership Summit and Sahitya Aaj Tak. In June 2018, he performed with his troupe at the Mumbai's National Centre for the Performing Arts (NCPA), where he also collaborated with Kaushiki Chakraborty.

Discography 
As a playback singer

TV Shows

Albums

Singles

Accolades

References

External links 

 Official website
 
 Mame Khan on Hungama.com
 
 Shakhsiyat with Mame Khan at Rajya Sabha TV
 Singer Mame Khan on being part of Manganiyar legacy, taking folk art to international platforms at Firstpost
 It's my dream to work with Rahman: Mame Khan  at Hindustan Times (Interview)

Living people
Indian folk singers
Bollywood playback singers
21st-century Indian singers
21st-century Indian male singers
People from Jaisalmer
Hindustani singers
Year of birth missing (living people)